Gamsole is a Nigerian start-up which produces mobile game. Gamsole was founded by Abiola Olaniran in April 2012.

History 
Founded in 2012 by Abiola Olaniran, a Google Student Ambassador and Computer Science graduate from the Obafemi Awolowo University who emerged Nigeria’s Microsoft Imagine Cup Winner in 2010 and became a world finalist of the student competition in the same year. Abiola also won the Samsung Developer Challenge.

As at February 2015, the games had been downloaded over 10 million times across 191 countries in Africa, Asia, Europe and South America. Company has created more than 35 games. Among Gamsole games are Gidi Run, Temple Run, Monster Ninja, Sweet Candy.

References

External links 
 Gamsole Website
 Gamsole on CNN
 Why Gamsole Doesn’t Build Games For Nigerians 
 Africa's games makers dream of exporting to the world
 Gamsole founder discusses inspiration

Mobile game companies
Video game companies established in 2012
Video game development companies
Video game publishers
Software companies of Nigeria
Nigerian brands